Röhm GmbH is a German chemicals company headquartered Darmstadt, Germany. Röhm employs around 3,500 employees at 13 sites in Germany, China, USA and South-Africa. In 2021, the company generated revenues of €1.8 billion. Röhm GmbH was founded through the carve-out of the Methacrylates Verbund and CyPlus GmbH from Evonik Industries.

History 
The origins of Röhm GmbH go back to the year 1907. At that time, the chemist and entrepreneur Otto Röhm, together with the businessman Otto Haas, founded Röhm & Haas GmbH, a predecessor company of today's Röhm GmbH. In 1933, the company successfully entered the then still young plastics industry with the development of the new type of acrylic glass (polymethyl methacrylate, PMMA), which later became world-famous under the brand name Plexiglas. After the death of Otto Haas, the company operated under the name Röhm GmbH from 1971. In 1989, the company was taken over by Hüls AG. After the merger of Hüls AG and Degussa AG, the business continued under the name Degussa-Hüls AG. With the formation of Evonik Industries AG in 2007, methacrylate chemistry was integrated into a separate business unit. As part of its strategic focus on specialty chemicals products, Evonik had sold the Methacrylate Verbund to the investment company Advent International in 2019. Since August 2019, the Methacrylates Verbund has again been operating under its original name Röhm GmbH.

Operations 
The activities of Röhm GmbH are focused on the development, production and distribution of methacrylate monomers, methacrylate polymers and cyanides. Röhm sells PMMA products under the Plexiglas brand in Europe, Asia, Oceania/Australia and Africa. In the Americas, the products are sold under the Acrylite brand.

Brands, products and applications 
Röhm's products include Plexiglas, the world's best-known brand for acrylic glass. The material is used in cars, aircraft windows, screens or displays, as construction glazing, noise barriers or in the advertising industry. Methyl methacrylate monomers of the Meracryl brand are also used in the manufacture of paints, floor coatings and adhesives through to dental products. Röhm also produces methacrylate resins under the Degalan, Degadur and Degaroute brands for the production of binders for paints and coatings, industrial flooring and road markings, as well as cyanides for the extraction of precious metals in the mining industry.

Sites 
The company operates production facilities at 13 locations on four continents. The administrative headquarters is in Darmstadt. In Germany Röhm produces in Worms, Hanau, Weiterstadt, Wesseling, Wörth am Main and Bad König. In Asia, Röhm produces in Shanghai, and in the United States in Fortier (Louisiana), Osceola (Arcansas), Sanford (Maine) and Wallingford (Connecticut). Other locations are in Coatzacoalcos (Mexico) and Elandsfontein (South Africa).

References 

German companies established in 1907
Chemical companies of Germany
Chemical companies established in 1907
Companies based in Hesse
Darmstadt